Lee Eun-young (born July 30, 1991), better known by her stage name Ben, is a South Korean singer and songwriter. She made her official debut in October 2012, with their first extended play 147.5. As of 2020 she released one studio album, five extended plays and fifteen singles.

Career
She was a member of South Korean band  from 2010 to 2011. The band disbanded after the departure of member Gaeul, but she made the transition to vocal soloist thanks to her mentor, Vibe's Yoon Minsu.

In October 2012, she released her first album, 147.5, as a solo vocalist, a compilation of sad ballads with string arrangements and piano, with the title referring to her diminutive height, reported as between 147.5 cm and 153 cm, or around 4 feet 10 inches to 5 feet tall.

In August 2015, she released her second EP My Name Is Ben, with nine tracks, including the title dance song "Looby Loo", which differed from her past ballad style, and other songs including jazz and R&B.

In November 2015, she released an album, Soulmate, which includes duets with singers MIIII and Sejun Im.

She has recorded many soundtracks, abbreviated as OSTs, for South Korean films and Korean drama or k-drama for television in South Korea.  In 2015, these included "Give Me A Hug" for Hello Monster, "Stay" for Oh My Ghost, "You" for Healer, and "Darling You" for Oh My Venus, a duet with Kim Tae-woo. In 2016, she sang "Like a Dream" for Another Oh Hae-young, recorded a duet with Xia Junsu for his fourth album, Xignature, entitled "Sweet Melody", sang "Misty Road" composed by Jinyoung of B1A4 for Love in the Moonlight and in 2017, she sang "Memory", one of the OSTs for "Introverted Boss".

On 2018, she released her first studio album, Recipe which contains nine tracks overall, she also released her fifth extended play Off The Record which was released in April 2020.

Personal life 
Ben is married to businessman Lee Wook. Their wedding took place on June 5, 2021 in a small ceremony with family and friends. On July 18, 2022, Ben announced that she was pregnant with her first child; she is expected to give birth in January or February 2023. She gave birth to a daughter on February 1, 2023.

Discography

Studio albums

Extended plays

Singles

Collaborations

Other songs

Soundtrack appearances

Filmography

TV series

Awards and nominations

Gaon Chart Music Awards

Genie Music Awards

Golden Disc Awards

Korea Popular Music Award

Melon Music Awards

Mnet Asian Music Awards

Notes

References 

1991 births
Living people
K-pop singers
South Korean women pop singers
South Korean female idols
South Korean rhythm and blues singers
Musicians from Incheon
21st-century South Korean singers
21st-century South Korean women singers